The London Borough of Camden is a London borough in Inner London. The borough was established on 1 April 1965 from the area of the former boroughs of Hampstead, Holborn, and St Pancras—which together, prior to that date, had comprised part of the historic County of London.

The cultural and commercial land uses in the south contrast with the bustling mixed-use districts such as Camden Town and Kentish Town in the centre and leafy residential areas around Hampstead Heath in the north. Well known attractions include The British Museum, The British Library, the famous views from Parliament Hill, the London Zoo, the BT Tower, The Roundhouse and Camden Market. As of 2021 it has a population of 210,136.

The local authority is Camden London Borough Council.

History

The borough was created in 1965 from the areas of the former metropolitan boroughs of Hampstead, Holborn, and St Pancras, which had formed part of the County of London. The initial Herbert Commission report recommended that the new borough consist of St Pancras and Hampstead, but Holborn was later added.

According to Enid Wistrich, who was a member of Hampstead Council at the time, the name "Camden" was the idea of Alderman Room, the Leader of Hampstead Council, and Mr Wilson, the Town Clerk, while travelling in a taxi through Camden Town. The name "Fleet" had also been suggested, after the underground river that flowed through the three boroughs, but that was rejected as the river was little more than a sewer. Other suggestions included "Penhamborn", 'Bornhamcras" and "Hohampion". Government guidelines for the naming of the new boroughs suggested that the chosen name should be short and simple, and ideally one that was generally associated with the centre of the new Borough. The name "Camden" met those criteria.

The name "Camden Town" was derived from Camden Place, the seat of Charles Pratt, 1st Earl Camden who had owned and developed land in the area in the 1790s.

The transcribed diaries of William Copeland Astbury, recently made available, describe Camden and the surrounding areas in great detail from 1829–1848.

There are 162 English Heritage blue plaques in the borough of Camden representing the many diverse personalities that have lived there.

Geography and economy

The borough was formed in 1965 by the merger of the metropolitan boroughs of St Pancras, Hampstead and Holborn. The first two of these had their origins in medieval Ancient Parishes of the same name, while Holborn was formed by a union of much smaller units.

The area of the old parish and borough of Hampstead in the north-west includes Belsize Park and part of Kilburn. The old parish and borough of St Pancras, which occupies most of the modern borough includes Camden Town, Kentish Town, Gospel Oak, Somers Town, King's Cross, Chalk Farm, Dartmouth Park, the core area of Fitzrovia and a part of Highgate.

In the south, the old Borough of Holborn was formed from the combined parish of Bloomsbury and St Giles, and most of the parish of Holborn (with the remaining part in the  ancient Farringdon Without ward of the City of London).

The economy and land uses of the West End and other southern parts of the borough reflect their more central location. Camden has the seventh largest economy in the UK with a number of major companies headquartered in the borough; Google is in the process of completing a major headquarter building in King’s Cross. Camden Town Brewery is among the newer businesses that have thrived in the borough.

In the far south of the borough, Lincoln's Inn Fields is within 500 metres of the Thames. The northern part of the borough includes the less densely developed areas of Hampstead, Hampstead Heath and Kentish Town. There are a number of Parks and open spaces in the London Borough of Camden. Neighbouring boroughs are the City of Westminster and the City of London to the south, Brent to the west of the originally Roman Watling Street (now the A5 Road), Barnet and Haringey to the north and Islington to the east. It covers all or part of the N1, N6, N7, N19, NW1, NW2, NW3, NW5, NW6, NW8, EC1, WC1, WC2, W1 and W9 postcode areas.

For planning policy purposes, the London Plan places Camden in the 'Central London' group of boroughs.

Governance and politics

Local government

Camden Town Hall is located in Judd Street in St Pancras. Camden London Borough Council was controlled by the Labour Party continuously from 1971 until the 2006 election, when the Liberal Democrats became the largest party. In 2006, two Green Cllrs, Maya de Souza and Adrian Oliver, were elected (to Highgate Ward) and were the first Green Party councillors in Camden. In 1985 when the borough was rate-capped, the Labour leadership joined the rebellion in which it declared its inability to set a budget in an unsuccessful attempt to force the Government to allow higher spending. Camden was the fourth to last council to drop out of the campaign, doing so in the early hours of 6 June.

Borough councillors are elected every four years. Since May 2022 the electoral wards in Camden are Belsize, Bloomsbury, Camden Square, Fortune Green, Frognal, Gospel Oak, Hampstead Town, Haverstock, Highgate, Holborn and Covent Garden, Kentish Town North, Kentish Town South, Kilburn, King's Cross, Primrose Hill, Regent's Park, St Pancras and Somers Town and West Hampstead.

Between 2006 and 2010 Labour lost two seats to the Liberal Democrats through by-elections, in Kentish Town and Haverstock wards. A Labour Councillor in Haverstock ward also defected to the Liberal Democrats in February 2009. The Conservatives also lost two seats, one to the Liberal Democrats in Hampstead, and one to the Green Party, Alexander Goodman, in Highgate, taking the total number of Green Party Councillors to three. At the local elections on 6 May 2010 the Labour party regained full control of Camden council.

The organisation's staff are led by the Chief Executive who is currently Jenny Rowlands. The organisation is divided into three directorates:
 Supporting People
 Supporting Communities
 Corporate Services

The directorates are headed by an Executive Director who reports directly to the Chief Executive. Each directorate is divided into a number of divisions headed by a Director. They, in turn, are divided into groups which are themselves divided into services. This is a similar model to most local government in London.

London Assembly
Camden forms part of the Barnet and Camden London Assembly constituency, represented by Anne Clarke of the Labour Party

UK Parliament
There are two parliamentary constituencies covering Camden: Hampstead and Kilburn in the north, represented by Labour's Tulip Siddiq, and Holborn and St. Pancras in the south, represented by Keir Starmer, the leader of the Labour Party.

Demographics

In 1801, the civil parishes that form the modern borough were already developed and had a total population of 96,795. This continued to rise swiftly throughout the 19th century as the district became built up, reaching 270,197 in the middle of the century. When the railways arrived the rate of population growth slowed, for while many people were drawn in by new employment, others were made homeless by the new central London termini and construction of lines through the district. The population peaked at 376,500 in the 1890s, after which official efforts began to clear the overcrowded slums around St Pancras and Holborn.

After World War II, further suburban public housing was built to rehouse the many Londoners made homeless in the Blitz, and there was an exodus from London towards the new towns under the Abercrombie Plan for London (1944). As industry declined during the 1970s the population continued to decline, falling to 161,100 at the start of the 1980s. It has now begun to rise again with new housing developments on brownfield sites and the release of railway and gas work lands around Kings Cross. A 2017 study found that the eviction rate of 6 per 1,000 renting households in Camden is the lowest rate in London.

The 2001 census gave Camden a population of 198,000, an undercount that was later revised to 202,600. The latest ONS projection puts the 2019 population at 270,000.

On 20 May 1999, the Camden New Journal newspaper documented 'Two Camdens' syndrome as a high-profile phenomenon differentiating the characteristics of education services in its constituencies. In 2006, Dame Julia Neuberger's book reported similar variation as a characteristic of Camden's children's health services. Her insider's view was corroboration – in addition to the 2001 "Inequalities" report by Director of Public Health Dr. Maggie Barker of "stark contrasts in" health and education opportunities – of earlier similar Audit Commission findings and a verification/update of the 1999 CNJ report.

Ethnicity
The following table shows the ethnic group of respondents in the 2001 and 2011 census in Camden.

Religion

The following shows the religious identity of residents residing in Camden according to the 2001, 2011 and the 2021 censuses.

Landmarks

Parks and open spaces

London is well known for its greenery and the Parks and open spaces in the London Borough of Camden  make an important contribution to this. Hampstead Heath is well known for its view over London, notably from Parliament Hill, its wild nature and its Hampstead Heath Ponds. Camden shares Regents Park with Westminster and the views from Primrose Hill are famous.

Attractions

 Bloomsbury Theatre
 BT Tower
 Camden Arts Centre
 Camden catacombs (see also Catacombs of London)
 Camden Market
 Parts of Covent Garden
 Dickens House
 Dominion Theatre
 Drama Centre London
 Euston station
 Fenton House
 Foundling Museum
 Freud Museum
 Grant Museum of Zoology
 Gray's Inn
 Hampstead Cemetery
 Hampstead Heath
 Hatton Garden
 Highgate Cemetery
 Jewish Museum London
 Keats' House
 Kenwood House
 King's Cross railway station
 Lincoln's Inn
 Parliament Hill Lido
 Phoenix Garden
 The eastern part of Regent's Park is in the borough
 The Place
 The Roundhouse
 Russell Square
 Shaftesbury Theatre
 Sir John Soane's Museum
 Upstairs at The Gatehouse
 World's End (Camden)
 London Zoo
 London Astoria
 Electric Ballroom
 Wellcome Collection
 Primrose Hill
 St. Pancras Library
 St Pancras railway station

Education

The Borough of Camden is home to a large number of primary, secondary and tertiary institutions. Over recent years, a number of significant institutions have moved into the borough or are planning to do so. The included Central Saint Martins, the Francis Crick Institute, as well as the planned move by Moorfields Eye Hospital, recently unveiled as Project Oriel.

Primary schools

The London Borough of Camden is the local education authority for the borough, organised through the Children, Schools and Families directorate.

Major public and private bodies
Some of London's best universities and teaching institutions are located in the Borough of Camden. They include the main campus of University College London, part of the campus of the London School of Economics near Lincoln's Inn Fields, and Central Saint Martins.

 The Architectural Association
 Birkbeck, University of London
 The British Library
 British Medical Association
 The British Museum
 Cancer Research UK
 Central Saint Martins
 Fordham University (London Centre)
 Francis Crick Institute
 Friends House
 Great Ormond Street Hospital
 Goodenough College
 London School of Hygiene & Tropical Medicine (part of University of London)
 National Hospital for Neurology and Neurosurgery
 National Union of Students
 Royal Academy of Dramatic Art
 Royal Central School of Speech and Drama
 Royal College of Anaesthetists
 Royal College of General Practitioners
 Royal College of Paediatrics and Child Health
 Royal College of Physicians
 Royal College of Surgeons
 Royal College of Veterinary Surgeons
 Royal Free Hospital
 Royal Veterinary College (Camden Campus)
 Senate House (University of London)
 School of Oriental and African Studies
 Slade School of Fine Art
 St Pancras Hospital
 Student Central
 Trades Union Congress (TUC)
 University College Hospital
 University College London
 The University of Law
 University of London Union
 Wellcome Trust
 Working Men's College

Public services

Police
Camden is policed by the Metropolitan Police Service. There are two police stations across the borough, situated at Holborn and Kentish Town. There are various other contact points around the borough including West Hampstead, Greenland Road, Highgate Road, Station House (Swiss Cottage), West End Lane, Hampstead Town Hall and Kingsway College. All locations have varying opening hours with Kentish Town Police Station open to the public on a 24-hour basis.

Hampstead Heath, situated within the London Borough of Camden and managed by the City of London Corporation, has its own Constabulary who deal with everyday incidents on the Heath, however, all serious criminal offences are passed to the Metropolitan Police to investigate.

With a large London Underground network and major railway stations such as King's Cross, St Pancras and Euston, Camden also has a much larger presence of British Transport Police (BTP) than many other London boroughs. BTP are responsible for policing Great Britain's railway network.

London Fire Brigade
The area has three fire stations: Euston, Kentish Town and West Hampstead and they are operated by London Fire Brigade in the borough of Camden. None of these fire stations are home to any specialist units; only pumping appliances and a rescue tender.

Public libraries
Camden is the home of the British Library. In addition, Camden has numerous libraries which include:
 Swiss Cottage Library
 Holborn Library
 Camden Town Library
 Kentish Town Library
 Pancras Square Library
 West Hampstead Library
 Kilburn Library
 Highgate Library
 Queens Crescent Library

As well as a number of community libraries including Keats community library.

Transport

There are no motorways in the borough, and few stretches of dual carriageway road, but the borough has great strategic transport significance to London, due to presence of three of the capital's most important rail termini, which are lined up along the Euston Road.

The position of the railway termini on Euston Road, rather than in a more central position further south, is a result of the influential recommendations of the 1846 Royal Commission on Metropolitan Railway Termini that sought to protect the West End districts a short distance south of the road.

Rail

National Rail
Three of the fourteen central London's railway terminals are located in the borough. , St Pancras and Kings Cross are the London termini for the West Coast, Midland and East Coast Main Lines and also High Speed 1. This connects the borough with the East of England, East Midlands, West Midlands, North East & West England, North Wales, Scotland, South East England, France, Belgium and the Netherlands.

Since 14 November 2007 when St Pancras International became the new terminus of Eurostar, a major regeneration of the area has occurred with the King's Cross Central development happening behind the station.

London Overground also operates the Watford DC Line services from Euston serving , trains continue to Watford in Hertfordshire.

Thameslink route services serve , Kentish Town and  stations. Currently the Thameslink network is undergoing a major expansion project called the Thameslink Programme. This will link more places in Southern England to the borough and to the East of England. While some services on the Great Northern network, which currently terminate at King's Cross will be diverted onto the Thameslink network, all work is due to be complete by 2016.

Underground

The London Borough of Camden is served by 18 London Underground stations and 8 of the 11 lines.

The three major rail termini are served by two underground stations,  and the combined  station. Between them, the termini are served by the Circle, Hammersmith & City, Metropolitan, Northern, Piccadilly and Victoria lines. The Central and Jubilee lines serve other parts of the borough, as does the Elizabeth line.

Future
The proposed High Speed 2 railway line to northern England is intended to terminate at Euston Station. The proposed Crossrail 2 line, (originally referred to as the Chelsea–Hackney line) would serve Euston and Tottenham Court Road underground stations. The increase in passengers at Euston as a result of the proposed High Speed 2 services is a major driver of the proposals.

The formerly proposed Cross River Tram was going to start in the borough of Camden but was scrapped by the former Mayor of London Boris Johnson in 2008.

Buses
All bus services are operated by Transport for London. Buses serve every suburb in the borough.

Statistics
The 2011 census found that the main forms of transport that residents used to travel to work were: underground, metro, light rail, tram, 21.5% of all residents aged 16–74; on foot, 9.2%; bus, minibus or coach, 9.2%; driving a car or van, 6.3%; work mainly at or from home, 5.2%; train, 4.1%; bicycle, 4.1%.

The census also found that 61% of households had no car, 32% had one car and 7% of households had 2 or more cars. There were an estimated 46,000 cars belonging to Camden residents.

Speed limit
This is to make roads safer for cyclists and pedestrians.

See also

 Camden Head
 Camden bench

References

External links

 Camden Town London website – News about the Camden Markets and Camden Town
 The website of Camden Council
 Camden TV
 Camden Town Online
 WHO's Commission 2008 finding on the Social Determinants of Health finding re 'two Camdens' syndrome (3rd para)
 Camden Council YouTube channel

 
1965 establishments in the United Kingdom
Camden